USS Rutoma (SP-78) was an armed motorboat that served in the United States Navy as a patrol vessel from 1917 to 1919.

Rutoma was built as the private motorboat Manchonac in 1910 by the Seabury Company at Morris Heights, New York. She had been renamed Rutoma by the time the U.S. Navy purchased her from her owner, Graham T. Thompson of New Haven, Connecticut, on 18 April 1917 for World War I service as a patrol boat. She was commissioned on 26 April 1917 as USS Rutoma(SP-78).

Rutoma patrolled in the 3rd Naval District during 1917 and 1918, operating in Long Island Sound and eastward to New Haven. Transferred to New York City at the end of the war, Rutoma was rammed and sunk on 21 February 1919 by the tug SS John L. Lewis in the East River off Pier No. 6 in New York City.

Rutoma was raised on 22 February 1919 by salvage crews from the salvage tug USS Resolute (SP-1309). She subsequently was sold on 16 September 1919 to Reinhard Hall of Brooklyn, New York, and returned to civilian use, remaining on mercantile registers into the 1930s.

Notes

References

Department of the Navy: Naval Historical Center: Online Library of Selected Images: U.S. Navy Ships: USS Rutoma (SP-78), 1917-1919. Previously a civilian motor boat named Manchonak and Rutoma.
NavSource Online: Section Patrol Craft Photo Archive Rutoma (SP 78)

Patrol vessels of the United States Navy
World War I patrol vessels of the United States
Ships built in Morris Heights, Bronx
1910 ships